Rainforest Trust is a US-based nonprofit environmental organization focused on the purchase and protection of tropical lands to strategically conserve threatened species. Founded in 1988, Rainforest Trust was formerly known as World Parks Endowment. In 2006, then World Parks Endowment affiliated itself with World Land Trust, a UK-based nonprofit environmental organization, and became World Land Trust-US, as both organizations were dedicated to minimizing their costs in order to allow donated funds to flow to habitat conservation projects on the ground. On September 16, 2013, because of diverging modus operandi, and as part of celebrating the organization's 25th anniversary, the World Land Trust-US changed its name to Rainforest Trust.

Rainforest Trust supports the purchase of large tracts of land by local NGOs working across tropical Asia, Africa, and Latin America for the purposes of protecting it, in a fashion similar to the Nature Conservancy by making use of land trusts. The organization also seeks to help in-situ conservation measures by providing training, capital and equipment for environmental stewardship in economically impoverished areas.

Most acres are permanently protected for an average of less than $100 per acre. As of 2018, Rainforest Trust has helped protect  of habitat.

Byron Swift was the CEO of the organization from 1988 until 2012 when Paul Salaman became the CEO. In 2020, James C. Deutsch became the CEO.

Robert S. Ridgely, President Emeritus, is an expert on neotropical birds, on which he has published several books, is a longtime conservationist, and is the co-discoverer of the jocotoco antpitta.

Project examples
 Fundación de Conservación Jocotoco critical habitat protection in Ecuador,
 Fundación ProAves critical habitat protection in Colombia,
 Asociacion Armonía critical habitat protection in Bolivia,
 Reserva Ecologica de Guapiaçu (REGUA)  Brazil Atlantic Rainforest protection,
 Madagasikara Voakajy  critical habitat protection in Madagascar,

References

External links
Official Rainforest Trust website

Forest conservation organizations
Rainforests
Land trusts in the United States
Nature conservation organizations based in the United States
Environmental organizations based in Virginia
Environmental organizations established in 1988
1988 establishments in the United States